Siege of Rhodes may refer to one of the following sieges of the island of Rhodes:

 Siege of Rhodes (305–304 BC), by Demetrius I of Macedon
 Siege of Rhodes (88 BC), siege by Mithridates VI of Pontus in the First Mithridatic War
 Hospitaller conquest of Rhodes (1306–1310), the  Knights Hospitaller invade Rhodes except for the city of Rhodes
 Siege of Rhodes (1444), unsuccessful attempt by the Mamluks under Aynal Gecut to expel the Knights Hospitaller from the island
 Siege of Rhodes (1480), first, unsuccessful attempt by the Ottoman Empire to expel the Knights Hospitaller from the island
 Siege of Rhodes (1522), second, successful attempt by the Ottoman Empire to expel the Knights Hospitaller from the island
 Battle of Rhodes (1912), capture of the island by Italy during the Italo-Turkish War
 Battle of Rhodes (1943), German capture of the island during World War II

It may also refer to:
 The Siege of Rhodes, an opera written by the impresario William Davenant, inspired by the 1522 siege